Hans Rasmussen is the name of:

 Hans Rasmussen (baseball) (1895–1949), American baseball player
 Hans Rasmussen (trade unionist) (1902–1996), Danish trade unionist and politician
 Hans Kjeld Rasmussen (born 1954), Danish sports shooter